Thomas Kiplitany (born 15 June 1983) is a Kenyan long-distance runner.

At the 2003 World Cross Country Championships he finished fifth in the short race, while the Kenyan team, of which Kiplitany was a part, won the gold medal in the team competition.

Personal bests
3000 metres - 7:51.07 min (2002)
3000 metres steeplechase - 8:12.91 min (2002)
10,000 metres - 27:32.30 min (2004)
Marathon - 2:10:05 hrs (2006)

External links

1983 births
Living people
Kenyan male long-distance runners
Kenyan male steeplechase runners
Kenyan male cross country runners